Qidong County is a county and the 8th most populous county-level division in the Province of Hunan, China; it is under the administration of Hengyang prefecture-level city. The county was formed from the eastern part of Qiyang County in April 1952 and was named after the east of Qiyang. The county has four subdistricts, 17 towns and three townships under its jurisdiction, the county seat is Hongqiao Subdistrict.

Geography 
Located in the central south of Hunan Province, the county is bordered to the north by Hengyang and Shaodong Counties, to the west by Shaoyang and Dong'an Counties, to the south by Lengshuitan District of Yongzhou, Qiyang County, to the east by Changning City and Hengnan County.

Qidong means the east of Qiyang County, the county was named after its location. It lies in the southwest of Hengyang and the northern bank of the middle reaches of the Xiang River. It is long and narrow from east to west, with higher altitudes in the north and low in the south. The terrain is tilted northwest to southeast, with the Siming Mountains encroaching on the west, and the Qishan Mountains stretching on the southwest, the generalized Dayun Mountains runs through the northeastern portion with the county seat at its feet. The Xiang-Gui railway, Xiang-Gui High-speed Railway, G322 National Highway, G72 Quannan Expressway, Hunan provincial route S210 and S317 have passed through its territory. The county is known as the Gorgeous Throat of Xiang-Gui.

Climate

Subdivisions 

4 subdistricts
 Baihe
 Hongqiao
 Yongchang
 Yuhe

3 townships
 Chenglian
 Fengdiping
 Maduqiao

17 towns
 Baidishi
 Buyunqiao
 Diaojiang
 Fengshiyan
 Guanjiazui
 Guiyang
 Guoshuiping
 Hezhou
 Huangtupu
 Jiangjia
 Jinqiao
 Liangshi
 Lingguan
 Shitingzi
 Shuangqiao
 Taihetang
 Zhuantang

Economy
According to preliminary accounting of the statistical authority, the gross domestic product of Qidong County in 2017 was 29,636 million yuan (4,389 million US dollars), up by 8.9 percent over the previous year. Of this total, the value added of the primary industry was 6,840 million yuan (1,013 million US dollars), up by 3.2 percent, that of the secondary industry was 9,908 million yuan (1,467 million US dollars), up by 7.5 percent and that of the tertiary industry was 12,889 million yuan  (1,909 million US dollars), up by 13.5 percent. The value added of the primary industry accounted for 23.08 percent of the GDP; that of the secondary industry accounted for 33.43 percent; and that of the tertiary industry accounted for 43.49 percent. The per capita GDP in 2017 was 29,827 yuan (4,418 US dollars).

External links
 Official Website
 Qidong News

References

 
County-level divisions of Hunan
Hengyang